The 2001 NCAA Division II football season, part of college football in the United States organized by the National Collegiate Athletic Association at the Division II level, began on August 30, 2001, and concluded with the NCAA Division II Football Championship on December 8, 2001 at Braly Municipal Stadium in Florence, Alabama, hosted by the University of North Alabama.

North Dakota defeated Grand Valley State in the championship game, 17–14, to win their first Division II national title.

The Harlon Hill Trophy was awarded to Dusty Bonner, quarterback from Valdosta State, his second consecutive Hill Trophy.

Conference and program changes
The Northeast-10 Conference began sponsorship of football this season with 10 member teams from the Northeast.
The Great Northwest Athletic Conference  began its first sponsorship of football during the 2001 season (it was disbanded in 2006 and re-formed again in 2008).

Conference standings

Conference summaries

Postseason

The 2001 NCAA Division II Football Championship playoffs were the 28th single-elimination tournament to determine the national champion of men's NCAA Division II college football. The championship game was held at Braly Municipal Stadium in Florence, Alabama for the 15th time.

Playoff bracket

See also
 2001 NCAA Division I-A football season
 2001 NCAA Division I-AA football season
 2001 NCAA Division III football season
 2001 NAIA football season

References